Yady Bangoura (born 30 June 1996) is a Guinean professional footballer who plays as forward for Belgian National Division 1 club RAAL La Louvière.

Club career
Bangoura was born in Coyah, Guinea. After playing with various amateur teams in Belgium, Bangoura signed a professional contract with RWDM on 27 May 2020. He made his professional debut with RWDM in a 2–0 Belgian Second Division win over Club Brugge II on 22 August 2020.

On 12 January 2023, Bangoura joined Belgian National Division 1 club RAAL La Louvière.

International career
Bangoura first represented the Guinea national team in a friendly 2–1 win over Cape Verde on 10 October 2020, scoring a goal in his debut.

References

1996 births
Living people
People from Coyah
Guinean footballers
Guinea international footballers
Association football forwards
K.V.K. Tienen-Hageland players
Royale Union Saint-Gilloise players
S.C. Eendracht Aalst players
RFC Liège players
R.W.D. Molenbeek players
K. Patro Eisden Maasmechelen players
K.V.V. Thes Sport Tessenderlo players
URSL Visé players
RAAL La Louvière players
Challenger Pro League players
Belgian National Division 1 players
Guinean expatriate footballers
Guinean expatriate sportspeople in Belgium
Expatriate footballers in Belgium